Ri Un-chol (born 13 July 1995) is a North Korean footballer who plays as a midfielder for Sonbong and the North Korea national team.

Career
Ri was included in North Korea's squad for the 2019 AFC Asian Cup in the United Arab Emirates.

Career statistics

International

International goals
Scores and results list North Korea's goal tally first.

References

External links
 
 
 
 Ri Un-chol  at WorldFootball.com

1995 births
Living people
People from Hamhung
North Korean footballers
North Korea international footballers
North Korea youth international footballers
Association football midfielders
2019 AFC Asian Cup players
North Korea under-20 international footballers